Júlia Láng (born 6 November 2003) is a Hungarian figure skater. She has represented her country at two (2018, 2019) Junior World Championships and made her senior debut at the 2021 World Championships. Láng is a three-time Hungarian national champion (2021–23).

Career

2017–2018 season
In March 2018, Láng represented Hungary at the 2018 World Junior Championships in Sofia, Bulgaria. Ranked thirty-second in the short, she did not advance to the free skate.

2018–2019 season
In the 2018–2019 season, Láng debuted in the ISU Junior Grand Prix series, placing twelfth in the 2018 JGP Slovakia and tenth in the 2018 JGP Slovenia.

In March 2019, she represented Hungary at the 2019 World Junior Championships in Zagreb, Croatia. Ranked tenth in the short, she vaulted into the penultimate (second-to-last) group for the free skate, where she placed fourteenth, falling to fourteenth overall.

2019–2020 season 
Láng competed at both the 2019 JGP USA in Lake Placid and at 2019 JGP Russia in Chelyabinsk, placing tenth and eleventh, respectively.

In senior competition, she placed fifteenth in the 2019 CS Nebelhorn Trophy and competed at several minor senior events.

2020–2021 season 
With the COVID-19 pandemic affecting international competition, Láng nevertheless competed at several European international competitions. She was chosen as Hungary's entry for the 2021 World Championships in Stockholm, where she finished in thirtieth place.

2021–2022 season 
Láng began the season competing at the 2021 CS Nebelhorn Trophy to attempt again to qualify a berth for Hungary at the 2022 Winter Olympics. She placed sixteenth at the event, outside of the range of qualification. She was thirteenth at the Budapest Trophy, before medaling at several minor international events, including a gold at the Jégvirág Cup. Láng won her second senior Hungarian national title, then took the bronze medal at the International Challenge Cup. She was thirty-first at the 2022 World Championships.

2022–2023 season 
Making her season debut on home ice at the 2022 CS Budapest Trophy, Láng finished in fourth position. She went on to place tenth at the  Volvo Open Cup and was only seventeenth at the 2022 CS Ice Challenge shortly afterward before placing fourth at the Santa Claus Cup. Competing at the 2023 Four National Championships, she finished third overall in the standings and first among Hungarians, winning her third consecutive national title.

Programs

Competitive highlights 
CS: Challenger Series; JGP: Junior Grand Prix

Detailed results 
Small medals for short and free programs awarded only at ISU Championships.

Senior results

Junior results

References

External links 

 

2003 births
Hungarian female single skaters
Living people
Figure skaters from Budapest